Mehdi Shiri  (born 14 May 1978 in Shiraz, Iran) is an Iranian football midfielder who played for and managed Bargh Shiraz in 2013. His younger brother, Mojtaba is also a footballer who played for Pas Hamedan.

Club career

He was one of the most talented players for Bargh and moved to Esteghlal and was mostly used as a substitute and moved back a season after to Bargh. He moved to Saba and again moved back to Bargh a season after again. He moved to Persepolis in June 2009.

Club career statistics

Last updated 10 May 2013

 Assist Goals

International career
Shiri has had only one appearance for Team Melli in the 2001 LG cup in Egypt when he came on as a substitute against Canada.

Honors

Club
Persepolis
Hazfi Cup
Winner: 2009–10, 2010–11

As a manager
Qashqai F.C. 
Iran Football's 3rd Division Champion Group C: 2015–16, promotion to Second Division.

References

1978 births
Living people
Iranian footballers
Bargh Shiraz players
Persepolis F.C. players
Saba players
Qashqai people
Esteghlal F.C. players
Persian Gulf Pro League players
People from Shiraz
Association football midfielders
Iran international footballers
Sportspeople from Fars province